Mirosław Zbrojewicz (born 25 February 1957) is a Polish actor.

Filmography

Actor cast 

 2018: My Secret Terrius (내 뒤에 테리우스) as spy
 2013: Spies of Warsaw (TV Series) as Marek
 2011: Kac Wawa as "Kaban"
 2010: Tajemnica Westerplatte  as warrant officer Jan Gryczman
 2009: Komisarz Blond i wszystko jasne  as American general
 2009: Mniejsze zło  as Esbek
 2009: Un paso adelante as Piotr's dad
 2009: M jak miłość as Siwy (guest appearance)
 2008: Lekcje pana Kuki  as Arnold
 2008: Latający Cyprian as innkeeper
 2007: Den Sorte Madonna as Kuntz
 2007: Fałszerze – powrót Sfory as Walas
 2006: Dublerzy as "Wiesiek"
 2006: Summer love as Boxer
 2006: Palimpsest as Bury
 2006: Pętla
 2005: Rozdroże Café as Gerard
 2004: Serce gór  as Gabin
 2004: Out of Reach
 2004: Alarm für Cobra 11 – Die Autobahnpolizei in episode 'Friends in Need'  as Russian weapon merchant
 2003: Warszawa
 2003: The Foreigner as Scar Face
 2002: D.I.L.  as Zubiec
 2002: To tu, to tam  as Pan Marian
 2002: E=mc² as "Śledź"
 2002: Sfora as inspector Walas
 2002: As
 2002: Rób swoje, ryzyko jest twoje as Mielona
 2002: Całkiem spora apokalipsa
 2001: Wiedźmin as Sorel
 2001: Requiem
 2000: Chłopaki nie płaczą as Grucha
 2000: Pierwszy milion  as "Morda", Kajzar's man
 2000: Rancid Aluminium
 2000: To my  as policeman
 2000: Cud purymowy as Waldek
 1999: Jakub kłamca as SS officer
 1999: Pan Tadeusz as Moskala's officer
 1999: Ostatnia misja as "Sztych" (not named in cast)
 1998: Amok as bandit
 1998: Małżowina as policeman
 1998: Rider of the Flames as corporal (not named in main cast)
 1997: Kiler as UOP agent
 1997: Krok  as general
 1997:  as beggar
 1997: Polowanie  as guard
 1996: Wirus as UOP agent
 1995: Gracze as Misza
 1995: Milles, Les as prisoner with newspaper
 1995: Prowokator as gendarme
 1995: Pułkownik Kwiatkowski as guard
 1995: Tato as Goryl
 1995: Ekstradycja
 1994: Psy II: Ostatnia krew
 1994: Oczy niebieskie  as guard on airport
 1994: Szczur
 1994: Ptaszka
 1994: Miasto prywatne as "Kaczor"
 1994: Detektyw i śmierć    (Detective y la muerte, El)
 1993: Łowca. Ostatnie starcie as conductor
 1993: Kraj Świata as sleepy store assistant (not named in cast)
 1992: Białe małżeństwo (not named in cast)
 1992: Enak
 1992: Pierścionek z orłem w koronie  as Ukrainian, who was rapping Wiśka
 1992: Sprawa kobiet (Violeur Impuni, Le) as Sylvie's guard
 1991: Cynga as doctor
 1991: Dziecko szczęścia
 1991: Głos
 1991: Panny i wdowy
 1990: Zima w Lizbonie (Invierno en Lisboa, El)
 1989: Ostatni dzwonek

External links 
 Mirosław Zbrojewicz at stopklatka.pl

References 

1957 births
Living people
Polish male film actors